Nicolae Ivan (born January 13, 1975) is a retired freestyle swimmer from Romania, who represented his native country at the 1996 Summer Olympics in Atlanta, Georgia. He is best known for winning the bronze medal in the men's 100 m freestyle at the 1996 European SC Championships in Rostock.

References
 
 

1975 births
Living people
Romanian male freestyle swimmers
Olympic swimmers of Romania
Swimmers at the 1996 Summer Olympics
Sportspeople from Constanța